From Evil's Pillow is a collection of stories by English writer Basil Copper.  It was released in 1973 and was the author's first collection of stories published in the United States.  It was published by Arkham House in an edition of 3,468 copies.

Contents

From Evil's Pillow contains the following stories:

 "Amber Print"
 "The Grey House"
 "The Gossips"
 "A Very Pleasant Fellow"
 "Charon"

Sources

1973 short story collections
Fantasy short story collections
Horror short story collections
Arkham House books